The Bushing Monarch is an annual title awarded in the Australian state of South Australia to the winemaker of highest scoring individual wine at the McLaren Vale Wine Show.  Established in 1973, the winner is crowned the "Bushing King" or "Bushing Queen" until they are disrobed when the next winner is announced.

Controversy 
Greg Trott was crowned Bushing King in 1984 following the abdication of Geoff Merrill after the winning wine was found to be outside the parameters for entry.

Wassail 
Part of the "coronation" tradition has been the local singing of a Wassail:

Multiple Coronations 
The following have been crowned on multiple occasions:

List of Bushing Monarchs

References 

Wine awards
Australian awards
Awards established in 1973
Recurring events established in 1973
1973 establishments in Australia
Australian wine